William Scarborough (born 1945) is a Democrat who represented District 29 in the New York State Assembly, which includes large portions of Queens County, including Jamaica. He chaired the Assembly Committee on Children and Families and served as a member of several other standing committees.

Scarborough grew up in Jamaica, Queens, and has also lived in St. Albans and Rosedale, graduated Public School 140 June, 1957, Shimer J.H.S. 142, and Andrew Jackson High School. He received an associate's degree from Queensborough Community College in 1970 and B.A. degree in psychology and political science from Queens College (City University of New York) in 1975.

He was an account executive with the New York Telephone Company from 1979 to 1983. His initial start in politics included a stint as a member of Community Board 28 (1977–1983). Prior to his election to the Assembly, Scarborough served as District Manager of Community Board 12 (1984–1994), as well as in the capacity of Chairman of Area Policy Board 12 (1983–1994).

Scarborough was first elected to the State Assembly in 1994. He ran uncontested in the 2008 and 2010 general elections.  During his tenure in the State Assembly, Scarborough was the Chair of the Small Business Committee and a vocal advocate for the City and State to address the flooding occurring in his district. Flooding in Southeast Queens is primarily the result of the restored water table that developed following the closure of the Greater Jamaica Water Companies pumping operations.

On October 1, 2014, Scarborough was indicted on eleven federal charges and 23 state charges of using campaign funds for personal benefit. In May 2015 he pleaded guilty and resigned his Assembly seat.  In September, 2015, Scarborough was sentenced to 13 months in federal prison for his crime. Since his release from prison, he has found employment with the Fortune Society, helping the recently released connect with social services.

References 

 

1940s births
Living people
African-American state legislators in New York (state)
People from Rosedale, Queens
Queens College, City University of New York alumni
Democratic Party members of the New York State Assembly
New York (state) politicians convicted of crimes
New York (state) politicians convicted of corruption
21st-century American politicians
Queensborough Community College alumni
People from St. Albans, Queens
Andrew Jackson High School (Queens) alumni
21st-century African-American politicians
20th-century African-American people